Drew County is a county located in the southeast region of the U.S. state of Arkansas. As of the 2020 census, the population was 17,350. The county seat and largest city is Monticello. Drew County was formed on November 26, 1846, and named for Thomas Drew, the third governor of Arkansas.

Located on the edge of the Arkansas Delta and the Arkansas Timberlands, its fertile lowland soils produced prosperity for early settlers in the antebellum era. Cotton was the major commodity crop, cultivated by the labor of enslaved African Americans. Corn, apples, peaches and tomatoes were also grown through their work. 

Following the Civil War, the boundaries of Drew County changed as some property, including Mill Creek Township, was reassigned to the new Lincoln County established by the Reconstruction-era legislature in 1871.

In the late 19th and early 20th centuries, timber harvesting became a more important industry here than cotton. The population declined from 1910 to 1970, as fewer workers were needed in timber. In addition, many African Americans left the oppressive social conditions of racial violence, disfranchisement, and Jim Crow laws to join the Great Migration to northern and midwestern industrial cities. After World War II, an even greater number migrated to the West Coast. 

As a variety of industries began to move to the county, several colleges were founded here in the early part of the 20th century. One developed as University of Arkansas at Monticello. Today, the county has a diverse economy and is an economic center in southeast Arkansas. Its population is majority white; these voters are mostly affiliated with the Republican Party.

Geography

Loggy Bayou is a swamp in Drew County, not to be confused with a bayou of the same name in northwestern Louisiana.

Major highways

 Future Interstate 69
 U.S. Highway 65
 U.S. Highway 165
 U.S. Highway 278
 U.S. Highway 425
 Highway 530
 Highway 4
 Highway 8
 Highway 35
 Highway 133

Adjacent counties
 Lincoln County (north)
 Desha County (northeast)
 Chicot County (southeast)
 Ashley County (south)
 Bradley County (west)
 Cleveland County (northwest)

Demographics

2020 census

As of the 2020 United States census, there were 17,350 people, 7,157 households, and 4,651 families residing in the county.

2000 census
As of the 2000 census, there were 18,723 people, 7,337 households, and 5,091 families residing in the county.  The population density was 23 people per square mile (9/km2). There were 8,287 housing units at an average density of 10 per square mile (4/km2). The racial makeup of the county was 70.30% White, 27.16% Black or African American, 0.25% Native American, 0.42% Asian, 0.02% Pacific Islander, 1.00% from other races, and 0.85% from two or more races.  1.76% of the population were Hispanic or Latino of any race.

There were 7,337 households, out of which 33.50% had children under the age of 18 living with them, 51.30% were married couples living together, 14.20% had a female householder with no husband present, and 30.60% were non-families. 26.00% of all households are made and 10.50% had someone living alone who was 65 years of age or older.  The average household size was 2.46 and the average family size was 2.97.

In the county, the population was spread out, with 25.80% under the age of 18, 12.60% from 18 to 24, 27.20% from 25 to 44, 21.50% from 45 to 64, and 12.80% who were 65 years of age or older.  The median age was 34 years. For every 100 females there were 94.10 males.  For every 100 females age 18 and over, there were 91.50 males.

The median income for a household in the county was $28,627, and the median income for a family was $37,317. Males had a median income of $30,794 versus $20,707 for females. The per capita income for the county was $16,264.  About 13.10% of families and 18.20% of the population were below the poverty line, including 21.90% of those under age 18 and 21.80% of those age 65 or over.

Government
Since the late 20th century, conservative white voters of Drew County have favored GOP presidential candidates. The last Democrat at the presidential level (as of 2020) to carry this county was Vice President Al Gore in 2000, who was a son of the South from Tennessee.

Communities

Cities
 Monticello (county seat)
 Tillar (partly in Desha County)
 Wilmar

Towns
 Jerome
 Winchester

Townships

 Bartholomew (contains Jerome)
 Bearhouse
 Clear Creek
 Collins
 Cominto
 Crook
 Franklin (contains part of Tillar)
 Live Oak (contains Winchester)
 Marion (contains Monticello)
 Saline (contains Wilmar)
 Spring Hill
 Veasey

Census-designated places
 Collins
 Lacey

Other unincorporated communities
 Baxter
 Coleman
 Montongo
 Selma
 Tennessee

See also
 List of lakes in Drew County, Arkansas
 National Register of Historic Places listings in Drew County, Arkansas

References

 
1846 establishments in Arkansas
Populated places established in 1846